Asefa Mengstu (born January 22, 1988) is an Ethiopian long-distance runner who specialises in road running competitions.

Half Marathon
Individually, he finished 15th at the 2010 IAAF World Half Marathon Championships, but he won a team bronze medal.

Marathon
Mengstu was the first ever winner of the OR Tambo Marathon.

He finished 7th in the 2017 London Marathon.

His personal best in the marathon is 2:04:06, set in the 2018 Dubai Marathon.

References

External links

Living people
Ethiopian male long-distance runners
Ethiopian male marathon runners
1988 births
21st-century Ethiopian people